PAW Patrol: On a Roll is a video game developed by Australian studio Torus Games and published by English studio Outright Games. It is based on the children's television series PAW Patrol, and was released on October 23, 2018, for Microsoft Windows, Xbox One, PlayStation 4, and Nintendo Switch.

Development 
The game was announced on February 24, 2018. A trailer for the game was released on September 27, 2018. A Nintendo 3DS version was planned, but was later cancelled.

References 

2018 video games
Windows games
Xbox One games
PlayStation 4 games
Nintendo Switch games
Cancelled Nintendo 3DS games
Video games about dogs
Video games about police officers
Video games developed in Australia
Video games based on television series
Platform games
Single-player video games
Nick Jr. video games
Torus Games games
Outright Games games